Melissa Bardin Galsky (born January 17, 1972) is an American voice actress, writer and producer for several animated sitcoms from the Soup2Nuts company. She was associate producer and talent coordinator for Dr. Katz, Professional Therapist. Galsky is best known for playing child actor Melissa on animated sitcom Home Movies, which was created by Brendon Small and Loren Bouchard.

She has voiced characters on two other shows animated by Soup2Nuts: O'Grady on Noggin, and Hey Monie! on BET, both also starring fellow Home Movies alumnus H. Jon Benjamin.

Galsky played the title role of "Lucy" in the Adult Swim series Lucy, the Daughter of the Devil, another series creation from Bouchard from 2007, replacing Jessi Klein from the pilot and again appearing alongside H. Jon Benjamin.

In 2011, Galsky teamed up again with Benjamin, voicing "Nora Samuels" in the seventh episode of Bob's Burgers – a show created by Bouchard – entitled "Bed & Breakfast" as well as other background characters in the show. She is now a production coordinator in New York City for that series.

Filmography

Film and television

References

External links
 
 Ten Questions with Melissa Galsky

1972 births
American voice actresses
Living people
Actresses from New York (state)
People from Harrison, New York
Television producers from New York (state)
American women television producers